The AFC U-23 Asian Cup, previously the AFC U-22 Championship (in 2013) and AFC U-23 Championship (between 2016 and 2020), is a biennial international football competition organised by the Asian Football Confederation (AFC) for the men's under-23 national teams of Asia. Each even-yeared edition of the tournament is linked to the qualification process for the Olympic Games, such as in 2016 and 2020, from which the top 3 teams qualified.

The first edition was initially set to be held in 2013 and its qualification matches in 2012, but the finals tournament was postponed to be played in January 2014 due to the 2013 EAFF East Asian Cup. In 2016 the tournament was also renamed from the "AFC U-22 Championship" to the "AFC U-23 Championship". The tournament was rebranded as the "AFC U-23 Asian Cup" in 2021.

Format 
The overview of the competition format in the 2016 tournament was as follows:

 16 teams competed in the final tournament, including the hosts which were automatically qualified.
 Teams were seeded by the result of 2013 AFC U-22 Championship.
 The tournament was held in 18 days.
 3 or 4 stadiums in at most 2 cities were needed to host the tournament.

In addition, players would be ineligible for participating in the AFC U-17 Asian Cup if they participated in a higher age group competition (this tournament or the AFC U-20 Asian Cup), though in reality it is rarely enforced.

Results

Teams reaching the top four

 Results from host teams shown in bold

Summary (2013-2022)
In this ranking 3 points are awarded for a win, 1 for a draw and 0 for a loss. As per statistical convention in football, matches decided in extra time are counted as wins and losses, while matches decided by penalty shoot-outs are counted as draws. Teams are ranked by total points, then by goal difference, then by goals scored.

Champions by regions

Comprehensive team results by tournament

Legend

 – Champions
 – Runners-up
 – Third place
 – Fourth place

QF – Quarter-finals
GS – Group stage
q – Qualified
 — Hosts

 •  – Did not qualify
 ×  – Did not enter
 ×  – Withdrew before qualification / Banned

Awards

Winning coaches

See also 
Football at the Summer Olympics
AFC U-20 Asian Cup
AFC U-17 Asian Cup
AFC Asian Cup

References

External links 
 

 
Asian Football Confederation competitions for national teams
Under-23 association football